Hungry refers to having hunger, the desire to eat.

Hungry may also refer to:

Albums 
 Hungry (Brainstorm album), 1997
 Hungry (Christian music album), a 1999 album of worship songs, or the title song
 Hungry (XYZ album), 1991
 Hungry, a 1971 album by Billy Guy, credited to The Coasters

Songs 
 "Hungry" (Dave Navarro song), 2001
 "Hungry" (Paul Revere & the Raiders song), 1966
 "Hungry" (Winger song), 1988
 "Hungry" (Fergie song), 2017
 "Hungry", a song by Common from One Day It'll All Make Sense
 "Hungry," a song by the Emersons, and a similar song by Billy Guy
 "Hungry", a song by Kutless from It Is Well
 "Hungry", a song by White Lion from Pride
 "Hungry", a song by Sepultura from Beneath the Remains

Other media 
 Hungry!, a 2012 Japanese TV drama
 "Hungry" (Space Ghost Coast to Coast), an episode of Space Ghost Coast to Coast
 "Hungry" (The X-Files), an episode of The X-Files
 Hungry: A Mother and Daughter Fight Anorexia, a 2009 book by Sheila and Lisa Himmel
 The Hungry, a 2017 film

Places 
 Hungry Range or Hungry Mountain, a mountain in Washoe County, Nevada, U.S.
 Hungry River, a river in North Carolina, U.S.
 Hungry Valley, a valley in Los Angeles County, California, U.S.

See also
 Hungry generation, a literary movement in the Bengali language launched in the 1960s
 hungry i, a defunct nightclub in San Francisco, California, U.S.
 I'm Hungry (disambiguation)
 Hungary
 Hunger (disambiguation)